Eddy Ellwood (born 30 March 1964) is a British world champion bodybuilder and professional Strongman competitor. Ellwood is best known for being a 5-time winner of the NABBA Mr Universe (pro) contest. He is also a 4-time winner of the England's Strongest Man title, including the IFSA version.

Early years/Bodybuilding
As a teenager, Eddy Ellwood was a boxer but found a lack of local opposition in the light-heavyweight division. He stepped up a division to heavyweight and this required more hours in the weight room.

This resulted in the 19-year-old Ellwood entering a junior bodybuilding contest which he won.

Eddy went on to win Mr. Britain, and was a five time Professional Mr Universe.

Strongman
In 2002, Eddy began competing in strongman, his first major contest was the 2002 Britain's Strongest Man contest. Eddy was winning his qualifying heat but suffered a severe biceps tear during the atlas stone event and was forced to withdraw from the competition.

Ellwood returned the next year and finished 4th at the 2003 Britain's Strongest Man, which earned him an invitation to the 2003 World's Strongest Man contest in Victoria Falls, Zambia. Eddy finished 4th again at the 2004 Britain's Strongest Man, and 7th in 2008.

Eddy also won the England's Strongest Man title three consecutive times from 2003–2005, as well as the IFSA version of England's Strongest Man in 2005.

References

English bodybuilders
English strength athletes
1964 births
Living people
People from Blackhall Colliery
Sportspeople from County Durham